Antoine Roger Rigaudeau (born 17 December 1971) is a French former professional basketball player and professional basketball coach.  During his playing days, he played at the point guard, shooting guard, and small forward positions. Also during his playing career, his nickname was "Le Roi" ("The King").

During his pro club career, he won two EuroLeague championships, in 1998 and 2001. With France's national team, he won the silver medal at the 2000 Olympics. He was inducted into the French Basketball Hall of Fame in 2010. He became a FIBA Hall of Fame player in 2015.

Professional career

Europe
Rigaudeau won the French Pro A League championship with Pau-Orthez, in 1996. With Virtus Bologna, he won the EuroLeague championship in the EuroLeague 1997–98 and EuroLeague 2000–01 seasons. With the same club, he also played in the EuroLeague Finals in 1999 and 2002. With Virtus Bologna, he also won two Italian Serie A League championships, in 1998 and 2001; and three Italian Cup titles, in 1999, 2001, and 2002.

NBA
Rigaudeau played in the National Basketball Association (NBA) with the Dallas Mavericks, during their 2002–03 season, after he signed a 3 year contract with the club, on 17 January 2003. With the Mavericks, he played in a total of 11 games, and averaged 1.5 points, 0.7 rebounds, and 0.5 assists per game, in 8.3 minutes played per game. On 18 August 2003, the Mavericks traded Rigaudeau's player rights to the Golden State Warriors, prior to the start of the 2003–04 NBA season. On 5 September 2003, the Warriors released Rigaudeau.

Return to Europe
After being released by the Golden State Warriors, Rigaudeau returned to Europe, and joined the Spanish ACB League club Valencia. He officially retired from playing pro club basketball in 2005, after he had previously suffered an Achilles tendon injury on his left foot.

National team career
Rigaudeau was a member of the senior French national team. He represented France at the 1991 EuroBasket, the 1993 EuroBasket, the 1995 EuroBasket, and the 1999 EuroBasket. With France, he won the silver medal at the 2000 Olympics.

In 2001, before that year's EuroBasket tournament, Rigaudeau retired from playing with the senior French national team. However, he later decided to rejoin the national team for the 2005 EuroBasket, where he won the bronze medal. He retired again from the French national team after that tournament. He had a total of 127 appearances with France's senior national team.

Coaching career
Rigaudeau began his professional coaching career in 2015, when he became the head coach of the French Pro A League club Paris-Levallois, which was later renamed to Metropolitans 92.

Honours and awards as a player

Clubs

Pau-Orthez
French Pro A League Champion: 1996

Virtus Bologna
2× Italian Serie A League Champion: 1998, 2001
2× EuroLeague champion: 1998, 2001
3× Italian Cup Winner: 1999, 2001, 2002

Senior French national team
1993 Mediterranean Games: 
2000 Olympics: 
2005 EuroBasket:

Individual honours and awards
3× French Pro A League Best Young Player: 1990, 1991, 1992
5× French League All-Star: 1990, 1991, 1993, 1994, 1995
5× French Pro A League French Player's MVP: 1991, 1992, 1993, 1994, 1996
FIBA European Selection: 1991
4× FIBA EuroStar: 1996, 1997, 1998, 1999
2× Italian League All-Star: 1997, 1998
2× EuroLeague Finals Top Scorer: 1998, 1999
EuroLeague All-Final Four Team: 1998
No. 4 retired by Cholet
French Basketball Hall of Fame: (2010)
FIBA Hall of Fame: 2015
Glory of Sport: 2017

See also
List of French NBA players

References

External links
NBA.com Profile
Basketball-Reference.com Profile
FIBA Profile
FIBA Europe Profile
Euroleague.net Profile
Italian League Profile 
Spanish League Profile 
Spanish League Archive Profile 

1971 births
Living people
Basketball players at the 2000 Summer Olympics
Chevaliers of the Légion d'honneur
Cholet Basket players
Dallas Mavericks players
Élan Béarnais players
FIBA Hall of Fame inductees
French basketball coaches
French expatriate basketball people in Italy
French expatriate basketball people in Spain
French expatriate basketball people in the United States
French men's basketball players
Levallois Metropolitans coaches
Liga ACB players
Medalists at the 2000 Summer Olympics
National Basketball Association players from France
Olympic basketball players of France
Olympic medalists in basketball
Olympic silver medalists for France
People from Cholet
Point guards
Shooting guards
Small forwards
Sportspeople from Maine-et-Loire
Undrafted National Basketball Association players
Valencia Basket players
Virtus Bologna players
Mediterranean Games bronze medalists for France
Mediterranean Games medalists in basketball
Competitors at the 1993 Mediterranean Games